Joseph Stanley Kimmitt (April 15, 1918 – December 7, 2004) was the Secretary of the United States Senate and Secretary for the Majority from 1977 to 1981. Kimmitt also served in World War II and the Korean War as a United States Army lieutenant colonel.  Kimmitt commanded a unit in the 8th Infantry Division in Germany from 1962 to 1964 before retiring from the Army as a colonel.  He went to work under Mike Mansfield, U.S. Senator from Montana, before becoming Secretary. Upon leaving the Senate, Kimmitt then worked on the APACHE (Attack Helicopter) program.  Kimmitt later founded Kimmitt, Senter, Coates, & Weinfurter, Inc. (KSC&W), a Washington, D.C. lobbying firm.  Stan Kimmitt died in 2004.

Joseph went to the University of Montana.

Three sons went into the military, all Field Artillery, including Brigadier General Mark Kimmitt, who served as Assistant Secretary of State for Political-Military Affairs, Major Joseph (Jay) Kimmitt, and Major General Robert Kimmitt, who served as Deputy Secretary of the Treasury, both under President George W. Bush.  J. Stanley Kimmitt and his wife, Eunice Kimmitt, also had three daughters, Kathleen Ross, Mary Kimmitt Laxton, and Judy Kimmitt Rainey and one other son, Thomas Patrick Kimmitt, who went to Georgetown University and then to medical school.

References

External links

 Library of Congress link to the Senate resolution on the passing of Stan Kimmitt
 Remarks from the US Senate floor on the passing of Stan Kimmitt.
 Obituary and remembrance of Stan Kimmitt from the Great Falls Tribune.
 Family tree on Rodovid
 Arlington National Cemetery
 

1918 births
2004 deaths
United States Army personnel of World War II
United States Army personnel of the Korean War
Burials at Arlington National Cemetery
United States Army officers
Secretaries of the United States Senate